Selenium trioxide is the inorganic compound with the formula SeO3. It is white, hygroscopic solid.  It is also an oxidizing agent and a Lewis acid.  It is of academic interest as a precursor to Se(VI) compounds.

Preparation
Selenium trioxide is difficult to prepare because it is unstable with respect to the dioxide:
2 SeO3  →  2 SeO2 + O2

It has been generated in a number of ways despite the fact that the dioxide does not combust under normal conditions. One method entails dehydration of anhydrous selenic acid with phosphorus pentoxide at 150–160 °C. Another method is the reaction of liquid sulfur trioxide with potassium selenate.
SO3 + K2SeO4 → K2SO4 + SeO3

Reactions
In its chemistry SeO3 generally resembles sulfur trioxide, SO3, rather than tellurium trioxide, TeO3.

At 120 °C SeO3 reacts with selenium dioxide to form the Se(VI)-Se(IV) compound diselenium pentaoxide:
SeO3  +  SeO2 →   Se2O5

It reacts with selenium tetrafluoride to form selenoyl fluoride, the selenium analogue of sulfuryl fluoride
2SeO3 + SeF4 → 2SeO2F2 + SeO2

As with SO3 adducts are formed with Lewis bases such as pyridine, dioxane and ether.

With lithium oxide and sodium oxide it reacts to form salts of SeVIO54− and SeVIO66−:  With Li2O, it gives Li4SeO5, containing the trigonal pyramidal anion SeVIO54− with equatorial bonds, 170.6–171.9 pm; and longer axial Se−O bonds of 179.5 pm.  With Na2O it gives Na4SeO5, containing the square pyramidal SeVIO54−, with Se−O bond lengths ranging from range 172.9 → 181.5 pm, and  Na12(SeO4)3(SeO6), containing octahedral SeVIO66−.  SeVIO66− is the conjugate base of the unknown orthoselenic acid (Se(OH)6).

Structure
In the solid phase SeO3 consists of cyclic tetramers, with an 8 membered (Se−O)4 ring. Selenium atoms are 4-coordinate, bond lengths being Se−O  bridging  are 175 pm and 181 pm, non-bridging 156 and 154 pm.

SeO3 in the gas phase consists of tetramers and monomeric SeO3 which is trigonal planar with an Se−O bond length of 168.78 pm.

References

Further reading

Oxides
Selenium(VI) compounds
Oxidizing agents
Interchalcogens